Dirk Boonstra may refer to:
Dirk Boonstra (born 1893) (1893–1944), member of the Dutch Resistance during World War II, later a Righteous Among the Nations
Dirk Boonstra (born 1920) (1920–1944), member of the Dutch Resistance during World War II, executed in 1944